John or Jack McIntosh may refer to:
John McIntosh (farmer) (1777–c. 1846), American-born Canadian farmer credited with discovering the McIntosh apple
John McIntosh (reformer) (1796–1853), businessman and political figure in Upper Canada
John Baillie McIntosh (1829–1888), Union Army general in the American Civil War
John McIntosh (Quebec politician) (1841–1904), member of the Legislative Assembly of Quebec and the Canadian House of Commons
John F. McIntosh (1846–1918), Scottish locomotive engineer
John Donald McIntosh (1850–?), politician in Manitoba, Canada
John William McIntosh (c. 1870–1939), physician and politician in British Columbia, Canada
John Charles McIntosh (1874–1940), lawyer and political figure in British Columbia
Jack McIntosh (English footballer) (1876–?), English football forward
Jack McIntosh (Australian footballer) (1878–1944), Australian rules footballer for Melbourne
John H. McIntosh (1879–1925), American college football coach
John Cowe McIntosh (1892–1921), British-born Australian aviator
John McIntosh (Australian politician) (1901–1971), New South Wales politician
Jack McIntosh (politician) (1909–1988), member of the Canadian House of Commons from Saskatchewan
John McIntosh (footballer) (born 1943), Australian rules footballer for Claremont and St Kilda
John McIntosh (educator) (born 1946), British headmaster of the London Oratory School
Jack McIntosh (strongman) (born 1988), British strongman competitor

See also
John Mackintosh (disambiguation)